The 2008 Camping World Indy Grand Prix at the Glen was the tenth round of the 2008 IndyCar Series season and took place on July 6, 2008 at the  Watkins Glen International road course in Watkins Glen, New York. The race was won by Ryan Hunter-Reay, who took the lead from Darren Manning on lap 52. The victory was Hunter-Reay's first in IndyCar competition, and the first for Rahal Letterman Racing since 2005.

Qualifying 
 All cars are split into two groups of thirteen, with the fastest six from each group going through to the "Top 12" session. In this session, the fastest six runners will progress to the "Firestone Fast Six". The fastest driver in this final session will claim pole, with the rest of the runners lining up in session order, regardless of qualifying times. (Fast Six from 1-6, Top 12 from 7-12 and Round 1 from 13-26) Drivers can use as many laps as they want in the timed sessions.

Race

References 
IndyCar Series (Archived 2009-05-21)

Camping World Indy Grand Prix at the Glen
Camping World Indy Grand Prix at the Glen
Camping World Indy Grand Prix at the Glen
Watkins Glen Indy Grand Prix